Birnie Kirk is a 12th century parish church located near Elgin, in Moray, Scotland. It was the first cathedral of the Bishop of Moray and is one of the oldest in Scotland to have been in continuous use. The graveyard, symbol stone and archaeological remains under the church have been designated a scheduled monument by Historic Environment Scotland.

Description
Birnie Parish Kirk is a 12th century parish church located 4 km south of Elgin, in Moray, Scotland. Birnie is one of the oldest churches in continual use in Moray. It is constructed of finely cut freestone ashlar. The building is rectangular in design with a square, short chancel, which is separated from the nave by a rounded chancel arch. The nave was shortened in 1734 when the was wall was rebuilt, and the church was later restored in 1891. In the corner of the nave stands a plain, Romanesque style font. The church contains lancet windows in the north and south.

The church is surrounded by an oval burial enclosure, which suggests an earlier medieval site. The wall on the north side of the enclosure was removed in the past in order to extend the cemetery. The Birnie Symbol Stone, a Class I Pictish symbol stone symbol stone stands  against the west wall in the enclosure. A decoration of an eagle, a Z-rod and a rectangular device is incised into the north side of the stone. The cemetery also contains a war memorial honouring local parishioners who died during World War I and World War II. The memorial, designed to look like the gable end of a chapel, contains two inlaid plaques which lie below a Romanesque arch.

History
Before the construction of Birnie, the site was known to have been the original seat of the Bishops of Moray. Simon de Tosnay, the fourth bishop, was buried in the church in 1184. Birnie was a commune kirk of the Cathedral of Elgin. There are no remnants of the earlier church, but the oval churchyard suggests the shape of am early Christian enclosure. The graveyard was designated a scheduled monument by Historic Environment Scotland. in 1969.  The church was listed in 1971 as a category A building. In 1997, the scheduled monument was updated to include the symbol stone located within the burial enclosure and the archaeological remains lying under the church.

See also

 Kilbirnie Auld Kirk
 Culdees

References

Churches completed in 1140
12th-century church buildings in Scotland
Church of Scotland churches in Scotland
Category A listed buildings in Moray
Listed churches in Scotland
Churches in Moray
Former cathedrals in Scotland
Culdees
Romanesque architecture in Scotland
1140s establishments in Scotland
Medieval cathedrals in Scotland